Gal Kurež (born 27 April 2001) is a Slovenian footballer who plays for Slovenian PrvaLiga club Bravo.

References

2001 births
Living people
Slovenian footballers
Association football forwards
Association football wingers
Slovenia youth international footballers
Slovenia under-21 international footballers
NK Olimpija Ljubljana (2005) players
NK Bravo players
Slovenian PrvaLiga players